Ľubomír Bajtoš (born 1965) is a retired Slovak football midfielder.

References

1965 births
Living people
Slovak footballers
FK Spišská Nová Ves players
1. FC Tatran Prešov players
FK Slavoj Trebišov players
FC Nitra players
Association football defenders
Czechoslovak First League players